Casual Day is a 2007 Spanish dark workplace comedy film directed by Max Lemcke. The ensemble cast features Juan Diego, Luis Tosar, Estíbaliz Gabilondo, Arturo Valls, Alberto San Juan, Malena Alterio, Álex Angulo, Carlos Kaniowsky, Secun de la Rosa, Marta Etura and Mikel Losada.

Plot 
Ruy is a young man who has always had it easy. But José Antonio, the father of his girlfriend Inés, gets him a job promotion in the company as José Antonio wants to groom Ruy as his successor, even if Ruy actually wants to dump Inés, so he finds himself cornered.

Cast

Production 
The screenplay was penned by Pablo and Daniel Remón. A Monfort Producciones, Telecinco Cinema and Videntia Frames production, the film was shot in between Madrid and Amasa (Gipuzkoa). Shooting wrapped in 2006.

Release 
The film premiered at the San Sebastián International Film Festival in September 2007. It also screened at the Gothenburg Film Festival, the Miami Film Festival and the Málaga Spanish Film Festival. It was theatrically released in Spain on 9 May 2008.

Reception 
Reviewing for Fotogramas, Mirito Torreiro rated Casual Day with 4 out of 5 stars, drawing out the entire cast, "without exception", to be the best thing about the film, assessing it to be "a stimulating opera prima that sheds light on the real situation of labour relations".

Javier Ocaña of El País deemed the film to be a "choral portrait of private and public contempt as stark as it is humorous, performed by a magnificent group of comedians", "written with precision, simplicity and an extremely dark sense of humour".

Accolades 

|-
| align = "center" rowspan = "7" | 2009 || rowspan = "7" | 64th CEC Medals || colspan = "2" | Best Film ||  || rowspan = "7" | 
|-
| Best Director || Max Lemcke || 
|-
| Best Actor || Juan Diego || 
|-
| Best Supporting Actor || Luis Tosar || 
|-
| Best Supporting Actress || Estíbaliz Gabilondo || 
|-
| Best Original Screenplay || Daniel Remón, Pablo Remón || 
|-
| Best Newcomer || Max Lemcke || 
|}

See also 
 List of Spanish films of 2008

References 

Workplace comedy films
2007 films
Spanish black comedy films
2007 black comedy films
Films shot in Madrid
Films shot in the Basque Country (autonomous community)
2000s Spanish films
2000s Spanish-language films